Emin Bülent Serdaroğlu (1886 – 28 November 1942) was a Turkish footballer, poet, and one of the founders of Galatasaray. He spent the entirety of his career with his hometown club. His grandfather was Serdar-ı Ekrem Ömer Pasha and his father was Ömer Muzaffer Bey. He lost his mother during childhood. He graduated from Galatasaray High School in 1905 and became the first Turkish captain of Galatasaray SK.

As a poet, he was a pioneer of the Fecr-i Âtî ("Dawn of the Future") movement, one of three movements of early Turkish literature. His poets Kin (1910) and Hisarlara Karşı are especially well known.

Honours

As player
Galatasaray SK
Istanbul Football League: 1908–09, 1909–10, 1910–11

References

1886 births
1942 deaths
Footballers from Istanbul
Galatasaray S.K. footballers
Galatasaray High School alumni
Turkish poets
20th-century poets
Association football defenders
Writers from Istanbul
Turkish footballers